Earlswood railway station is located on the western fringe of the village of Earlswood on the West Midlands/Warwickshire border in England. The platforms straddle the county border, with the approach road on the West Midlands side. The station, and all trains serving it, are operated by West Midlands Trains.

Originally opened as Earlswood Lakes in mid-1908, the station was renamed Earlswood on 6 May 1974  despite being located next to the settlement of Foreshaw Heath and The Lakes railway station being located closer to Earlswood village.

Services

See also
The Lakes railway station

References

External links

Earlswood station at warwickshirerailways.com
Rail Around Birmingham and the West Midlands: Earlswood station

Railway stations in Solihull
DfT Category F2 stations
Former Great Western Railway stations
Railway stations in Great Britain opened in 1908
Railway stations served by West Midlands Trains
1908 establishments in England
Tanworth-in-Arden